Alfa Agkimpou Ntiallo Fasengas (alternate spellings: Alpha, Diallo, Dialo, Ntialo) (born 13 October 1992), is a Guinean professional basketball player for Pagrati and .

Early life
Ntiallo was born in Mitty, Guinea. He moved to Larissa, Greece, in 2009, at the age of 16.

Professional career
After playing with the youth clubs of Olimpia Larissa, Panathinaikos, and Ikaros, Ntiallo began his professional career in the Greek 2nd Division with Panerythraikos in 2012. He then moved to the Greek 2nd Division club Irakleio. He moved to Filathlitikos in 2013.

He joined Pagrati in 2014, and then in 2015, he moved to Xuventude to play in the Spanish 3rd Division.

National team career
Ntiallo was a member of the Greek junior national teams. With Greece's junior national team, he played at the 2010 FIBA Europe Under-18 Championship.

Later, he joined the Guinea national basketball team and played with the squad at AfroBasket 2017.

References

External links
FIBA Profile
FIBA Europe Profile
Eurobasket.com Profile

1992 births
Living people
Centers (basketball)
EFAO Zografou B.C. players
Greek men's basketball players
Guinean men's basketball players
Guinean emigrants to Greece
Greek people of Guinean descent
Irakleio B.C. players
Kavala B.C. players
Pagrati B.C. players
Power forwards (basketball)
Psychiko B.C. players
People from Mamou Region